Gustav Mensching (6 May 1901 – 30 September 1978) was a German theologian who was Professor of Comparative Religious Studies at the University of Bonn from 1936 to 1972.

Biography
Gustav Mensching was born in Hanover, Germany on 6 May 1901, the son of farmer and businessman Gustav Mensching (1869-1906) and Anna Vogler. Mensching studied philosophy, Protestant theology and religious studies at the universities of Göttingen, Marburg and Berlin. He gained his Dr. Theol. at Maburg under the supervision of Rudolf Otto. 

Mensching completed his habilitation in religious history at the University of Braunschweig in 1927. The same year he married Erika Dombrowski, with whom he had two sons, the Germanist  and philosopher . From 1927 to 1936, Mensching was Associate Professor of Religious Studies at the University of Riga. In 1936 he was appointed Professor of Comparative Religious Studies at the University of Bonn. Due to his membership in the National Socialist German Lecturers League, Mensching was from 1946 to 1948 prohibited from teaching.  has since demonstrated was Mensching was not a supporter of Nazism. Mensching published a number of works on religion.

Mensching retired from the University of Bonn in 1972. He died in Düren, Germany on 30 September 1978.

See also
 Otto Huth

Selected works
 Das heilige Schweigen; 1926
 Die Idee der Sünde; 1931
 Zum Streit um die Deutung des buddhistischen Nirvana; 1933
 Zur Metaphysik des Ich; 1934
 Der Katholizismus – Sein Stirb und Werde; Herausgeber; 1937
 Das heilige Wort; 1937
 Volksreligion und Weltreligion;1938
 Vergleichende Religionswissenschaft; 1938
 Allgemeine Religionsgeschichte; 1940, 19492
 Der Schicksalsgedanke in der Religionsgeschichte. Bonn 1942. 15 S. (Antrittsvorlesungen als Kriegsvorträge der Rheinischen Friedrich-Wilhelms-Universität Bonn; Heft 12)
 Soziologie der Religion; 1947
 Geschichte der Religionswissenschaft; 1948
 Die Religionen und die Welt; 1947
 Gut und Böse im Glauben der Völker; 19502
 Buddhistische Geisteswelt; 1955
 Toleranz und Wahrheit in der Religion; 1955; Neuausgabe, hg. von Udo Tworuschka 1996
 Leben und Legende der Religionsstifter; 1955
 Religiöse Ursymbole der Menschheit; 1955
 Die Söhne Gottes; 1958
 Die Religion. Erscheinungsformen, Strukturtypen und Lebensgesetze; 1959
 Idee und Aufgabe der Weltuniversität; 1962
 Soziologie der großen Religionen; 1966
 Topos und Typos. Motive und Strukturen religiösen Lebens; hg. von Hans Joachim Klimkeit, 1971
 Die Weltreligionen; 1972
 Der offene Tempel. Die Weltreligionen im Gespräch miteinander; Stuttgart 1974
 Buddha und Christus; 1978; Neuausgabe als Herder TB 2004
 Aufsätze und Vorträge Gustav Menschings zur Toleranz- und Wahrheitskonzeption; Bausteine zur Mensching-Forschung 2; hrsg. v. Hamid Reza Yousefi; Würzburg 2002
 Der Irrtum in der Religion (Stuttgart 1969). Neu hrsg. mit dem neuen Untertitel: Eine Einführung in die Phänomenologie des Irrtums; hrsg. von Hamid Reza Yousefi und Klaus Fischer; Nordhausen 2003

Sources

 Udo Tworuschka: Religionsbewertung als Problem und Aufgabe. Die Haltung Gustav Menschings zur Religionsmessung. In: Zeitschrift für Religions- und Geistesgeschichte. 27, 1975, S. 122–140.
 
 Wolfgang Gantke, Karl Hoheisel, Wilhelm P. Schneemelcher (Hrsg.): Religionswissenschaft im historischen Kontext. diagonal, Marburg 2003,  (= Religionswissenschaftliche Reihe. Band 21).
 Hamid Reza Yousefi, Ina Braun: Gustav Mensching – Leben und Werk. Ein Forschungsbericht zur Toleranzkonzeption, Gewidmet Gustav Mensching anlässlich seines 100. Geburtstages. Königshausen und Neumann, Würzburg 2002,  (= Bausteine zur Mensching-Forschung. Band 1).
 
 Hamid Reza Yousefi: Der Toleranzbegriff im Denken Gustav Menschings. Eine interkulturelle philosophische Orientierung. Bautz, Nordhausen 2004,  (= Bausteine zur Mensching-Forschung. Band 7).
 Hamid Reza Yousefi: Angewandte Toleranz. Gustav Mensching interkulturell gelesen. Bautz, Nordhausen 2008,  (= Interkulturelle Bibliothek. Band 49).
 Nikandrs Gills: Gustav Mensching and University of Latvia. In: The European connection. Baltic intellectuals and the history of Western philosophy and theology, Riga 2006, S. 44–57
Christian Grethlein: Gustav Mensching (1901–1978). In: Benedikt Kranemann/Klaus Raschzok (Hrsg.): Gottesdienst als Feld theologischer Wissenschaft im 20. Jahrhundert, Münster 2001, Bd. 2, S. 722–731
 Udo Tworuschka: Religionswissenschaft. Wegbereiter und Klassiker, Böhlau, Köln, Weimar, Wien 2011, S. 214–237.
 Udo Tworuschka: Einführung in die Geschichte der Religionswissenschaft, WBG, Darmstadt 2014

1901 births
1976 deaths
German theologians
People from Hanover
Academic staff of the University of Bonn
University of Marburg alumni
Academic staff of the University of Latvia